Tuberculosis (TB) vaccines are vaccinations intended for the prevention of tuberculosis.   Immunotherapy as a defence against TB was first proposed in 1890 by Robert Koch. Today, the only effective tuberculosis vaccine in common use is the Bacillus Calmette-Guérin (BCG) vaccine, first used on humans in 1921. About three out of every 10,000 people who get the vaccine experience side effects, which are usually minor except in severely immuno-depressed individuals. While BCG immunization provides fairly effective protection for infants and young children (including defence against TB meningitis and miliary TB), its efficacy in adults is variable, ranging from 0% to 80%. Several variables have been considered as responsible for the varying outcomes.  Demand for TB immunotherapy advancement exists because the disease has become increasingly drug-resistant.

Other tuberculosis vaccines are at various stages of development, including:
 MVA85A
 rBCG30
 72F fusion protein
 MTBVAC

New vaccines are being developed by the Tuberculosis Vaccine Initiative, including TBVI and Aeras.

Vaccine development 

To promote successful and lasting management of the TB epidemic, effective vaccination is required. Although the World Health Organization (WHO) endorses a single dose of BCG, revaccination with BCG has been standardized in most, but not all countries. However, improved efficacy of multiple dosages has yet to be demonstrated.

Vaccine development is proceeding along several paths:
 Development of a new prime vaccine to replace BCG
 Development of sub-unit or booster vaccines to supplement BCG
 Pre-infection
 Booster to BCG
 Post-infection
 Therapeutic vaccine

Since the BCG vaccine does not offer complete protection against TB, vaccines have been designed to bolster BCG's effectiveness. The industry has now transitioned from developing new alternatives, to selecting the best options currently available to advance into clinical testing. MVA85A is characterized as the “most advanced ‘boost’ candidate” to date.

Delivery alternatives 

BCG is currently administered intradermally. To improve efficacy, research approaches have been directed at modifying the delivery method of vaccinations.

Patients can receive MVA85A intradermally or as an oral aerosol. This particular combination proved to be protective against mycobacterial invasion in animals, and both modes are well tolerated. The design incentive behind aerosol delivery is to target the lungs rapidly, easily and painlessly in contrast to intradermal immunization. In murine studies, intradermal vaccination caused localized inflammation at the site of injection whereas MVA85A did not cause unfavourable effects. A correlation has been found between the mode of delivery and vaccine protection efficacy.  Research data suggests aerosol delivery has not only physiological and economic advantages, but also the potential to supplement systemic vaccination.

Obstacles in development 
Treatment and prevention of TB has been delayed compared to the resources and research efforts put into other diseases. Large pharmaceutical companies do not see profitable investment because of TB's association with the developing world.

Progression of vaccine designs relies heavily on outcomes in animal models. Appropriate animal models are scarce because it is difficult to imitate TB in non-human species. It is also challenging finding a species to test on a large scale. Most animal testing for TB vaccines has been conducted on murine, bovine and non-primate species.  Recently, a study deemed zebrafish a potentially suitable model organism for preclinical vaccine development.

References